Glynn is a surname. Notable people with the surname include:

Bill Glynn (baseball) (1925–2013), baseball player
 Brendan Glynn (1910–1986), Fine Gael Teachta Dála
Brian Glynn (born 1967), Canadian hockey player
Camillus Glynn (born 1941), Irish politician
Carlin Glynn (born 1940), American actress
Connie Glynn (born 1994), English YouTuber and author
Dominic Glynn (born 1960), British composer
Eleanor Glynn (born 1986), British model
 Erica Glynn (born 1964), Australian filmmaker, daughter of Freda Glynn
 Freda Glynn (born 1939), Australian photographer, mother of Erica Glynn
Gene Glynn (born 1956), American baseball player and coach
Henry Richard Glynn (1768-1856), British admiral
Ian Glynn (born 1928), British biologist
James Glynn (1800–1871), U.S. Navy officer
James P. Glynn (1867-1930), U.S. congressman from Connecticut
Jeanne Glynn (1932-2007), television screenwriter
John Glynn (1722–1779), English lawyer and Member of Parliament
 Johnny Glynn (c.1917-1959), President of the Irish Rugby Football Union
 Joseph Glynn (politician), (1869–1943), politician, knight and historian
 Martin Glynn (Rector) (died 1794), last Rector of the Irish College of Bordeaux
Martin H. Glynn (1871-1924), American politician
Mary Ann Glynn, American academic
Paddy Glynn (1855-1931), Australian Attorney General
Paul Glynn (born 1928), Australian priest
 Pauline McLynn (born 1962), actress, comedian and author
 Rona Glynn (1936–1965), first Aboriginal Australian teacher in Alice Springs, sister of Freda Glynn
 Sharon Glynn, camogie player and manager
 Steven Glynn (born 1988), Canadian sports analyst known as Steve Dangle
Thomas Robinson Glynn (1841–1931), British physician

Fictional characters
Warden Leo Glynn, the warden of the Oswald state correctional facility on the HBO drama Oz

See also
 Glyn (surname)
 Flann Mac Flainn, Archbishop of Tuam (1250–56)
 Nicol Mac Flainn, Archbishop-elect of Tuam, fl. 1283
 Pádraig Mag Fhloinn, also known as Pat Glynn, scribe, fl. 1828-1835
 Seán Mag Fhloinn, scribe, fl. 1843-1915

English-language surnames